Civil War History is an academic journal of the American Civil War. It was established in 1955 at the State University of Iowa and is published quarterly by Kent State University Press. Topics covered in this journal include slavery and abolition, antebellum and Reconstruction politics, diplomacy, social and cultural developments, and military history. Notable contributors include Stephen Ambrose, Charles B. Dew, Gary W. Gallagher, James M. McPherson, Mark E. Neely Jr., James I. Robertson Jr., and T. Harry Williams.

Indexing

Civil War History is abstracted and indexed in the following bibliographic databases:

See also 
 List of history journals

References 

History journals
Academic journals of the United States
Kent State University
American Civil War
Publications established in 1955
Philosophy Documentation Center academic journals